N.M.A.M. Institute of Technology (NMAMIT), full name Nitte Mahalinga Adyanthaya Memorial Institute of Technology, is a deemed engineering college in Nitte, Karnataka, India. It was established in 1986, with programs in computer science, mechanical engineering, civil engineering and electrical engineering.

Currently it offers BTech programs in Artificial Intelligence & Machine Learning,Artificial Intelligence and Datascience,Biotechnology Engineering, Civil Engineering, Computer & Communications Engineering, Computer Science and Engineering, Electronics and Communication Engineering, Electrical and Electronics Engineering, Information Science and Engineering, Mechanical Engineering and Robotics & Artificial Intelligence.

The college is run by the Nitte Education Trust, which was founded in 1979 by Justice Kowdoor Sadananda Hegde, former Chief Justice of the Supreme Court and former Speaker of the Lok Sabha. The college was affiliated to the Visvesvaraya Technological University, Belgaum. It received the autonomous status in 2007-08. And now has been constituent college of Nitte University, Mangalore since June 2022.

Rankings

N.M.A.M. Institute of Technology was ranked 175 among engineering colleges by the National Institutional Ranking Framework (NIRF) in 2022.

Campus

The college is situated in the village of Nitte in an interior area of Udupi district. The various departments, laboratories, and hostels are located on a  campus.

Notable alumni
 Rakshith Shetty, Actor
 Kavya Shetty, Actress
Nabha Natesh, Actress
 Nischal Shetty,Founder and CEO of WazirX

References

External links

 Official website

All India Council for Technical Education
Affiliates of Visvesvaraya Technological University
Engineering colleges in Karnataka
Universities and colleges in Udupi district
Educational institutions established in 1986
1986 establishments in Karnataka